Louis Marie Cordonnier (July 7, 1854, Haubourdin, Nord – 1940) was a French architect, born in Haubourdin and associated principally with Lille and the French Flanders region.

Biography 

Son of the architect Jean-Baptiste Cordonnier (1820–1902), Cordonnier studied at the Ecole des Beaux-Arts in Paris.  He returned to Lille for his first major commission, the 1881 town hall of Loos.  His chosen style was a strongly regional Flemish Renaissance Revival in brick, with a characteristic belfry tower.

Further civic commissions in the area culminated in Cordonnier's best known work, the Peace Palace in The Hague, seat of the International Court of Justice.  There his neo-Flemish entry won a design competition against far more modern competitors like Hendrik Berlage and Otto Wagner.  The jury's choice proved controversial enough to fuel lawsuits for seven years.

Cordonnier alternated his regional Flemish style with occasional essays in the neo-classical Beaux-Arts style so prevalent in Paris during these years.  In Lille the architect's Flemish Chamber of Commerce building of 1910–21 stands twenty paces away from his Beaux-Arts Opéra de Lille of 1903–14, its design said to be inspired by Garnier's Paris Opera.

In the wake of the widespread destruction of World War I in this part of France, Cordonnier took the lead in efforts to rebuild civic buildings and local churches in strictly traditional style, although not averse to using structural concrete.  Towards the end of his career he was joined in practice by his son, Louis-Stanislas Cordonnier (1884–1960).

Work 
His work includes:

 the Opéra de Lille, built 1903-1914
 Notre-Dame-de-Lille Pellevoisin, Lille, 1906–1911
 the Peace Palace in The Hague, 1907–1913
 series of seaside mansions and villas at Neufchâtel-Hardelot, circa 1908-1912
 Chamber of Commerce de Lille, 1910–1921
 basilica and memorial building, Notre Dame de Lorette war cemetery, 1921–1927
 the Basilica of St. Thérèse, Lisieux, the second-largest pilgrimage site in France, after Lourdes, 1923–1959
 Church of St. Vaast, Béthune, 1924–1927
 Church of St. Vaast, Bailleul, 1935
 Grands bureaux de la Société des Mines headquarters, in Lens, Pas-de-Calais, with landscape architect Achille Duchêne, 1928–1930, now part of Artois University
 four of the Belfries of Belgium and France designated by UNESCO as a World Heritage Site.  Of the 23 such municipal towers within Nord-Pas-de-Calais and the Somme, Cordonnier designed those in Loos, Dunkirk, Comines, and Armentières.

Gallery

Sources

External links

1854 births
1940 deaths
19th-century French architects
20th-century French architects
People from Nord (French department)
Members of the Académie des beaux-arts